Dutch Neck Crossroads is an unincorporated community in Kent County, Delaware, United States. The Allee House, which is listed on the National Register of Historic Places, is located in Dutch Neck Crossroads.

References

Unincorporated communities in Kent County, Delaware
Unincorporated communities in Delaware